Waves Are Universal is the debut solo album from former Slowdive and Mojave 3 singer/guitarist Rachel Goswell. It was produced by David Naughton, and released by 4AD on June 14, 2004, in the UK and June 22, 2004, in the US. The album was recorded after production and touring for Mojave 3's album Spoon and Rafter resumed. The songs "Plucked" and "Sleepless & Tooting" appeared on Rachel's EP The Sleep Shelter, released prior to the album in May 2004, and both "Coastline" and "Plucked" were remixed and featured on a special single released in February 2005. Waves Are Universal was released to generally positive reviews, receiving an overall 66% positive rating on Metacritic. In December 2004, American webzine Somewhere Cold ranked Waves Are Universal No. 7 on their 2004 Somewhere Cold Awards Hall of Fame list.

Track listing
 "Warm Summer Sun" – 3:45
 "Gather Me Up" – 2:24
 "No Substitute" – 4:36
 "Deelay" – 4:13
 "Plucked" – 3:08
 "Hope" – 3:52
 "Coastline" – 5:43
 "Shoulder the Blame" – 3:06
 "Save Yourself" – 3:59
 "Thru the Dawn" – 3:09
 "Beautiful Feeling" – 3:27
 "Sleepless & Tooting" – 3:01

Credits
 Produced, engineered, and mixed by David Naughton.
 "Warm Summer Sun"
 Rachel Goswell – vocals, accordion, squeeze box
 Joe Light – acoustic guitar, 12-string guitar
 David Naughton – dumb bass, fuzz bass, 12-string guitar, shaker
 Bill Drake – piano
 Jerome Farrell – uilleann pipes
 Ashley Bates – drums
 Ambiences: Lostwithiel church bells and Chislehurst Caves
 "Gather Me Up"
 Rachel Goswell – vocals, acoustic guitar
 Bill Drake – harmonium
 Jerome Farrell – low D whistle
 Ashley Bates – ding
 Mother Nature: Lostwithiel birds and ambience
 "No Substitute"
 Rachel Goswell – vocals, claps
 Joe Light – acoustic guitar, 12-string guitar, electric guitar
 David Naughton – bass, shaker, tambourine, claps
 Ashley Bates – drums
 Bill Drake – piano
 Ambience: St Merryn airfield
 "Deelay"
 Rachel Goswell – vocals
 Joe Light – acoustic guitar, swell guitar, rhythm guitar, ebo guitar
 David Naughton – bass, accordion, shaker, tambourine, guitar knock, heartbeat
 "Plucked"
 Rachel Goswell – vocals
 Joe Light – acoustic guitars
 David Naughton – caved Wurlitzer, string arrangement
 Jeremy Perl – cello
 Bronwyn Stride – violin
 Ambiences: Chislehurst Caves and Thai insects
 "Hope"
 Rachel Goswell – vocals
 Joe Light – acoustic guitars
 David Naughton – bass, percussion
 Bill Drake – harmonium
 Lynne Jackaman – bangles
 Ambiences: Camden Road and Chislehurst Caves
 "Coastline"
 Rachel Goswell – vocals, rhythm guitar, lead guitar
 Joe Light – slide guitar, guitar effects
 David Naughton – bass, 12-string guitar, bongos
 Ashley Bates – drums, tambourine, lion's roar
 "Shoulder the Blame"
 Rachel Goswell – vocals
 Joe Light – bass, acoustic guitar, arch top slide guitar, lead guitar
 David Naughton – pot, letterbox bells
 Mother Nature: Thai waves
 "Save Yourself"
 Rachel Goswell – vocals, acoustic strum guitar
 Joe Light – acoustic guitar, electric guitar
 David Naughton – harmonium
 Bill Drake – piano
 Ashley Bates – drums
 "Thru the Dawn"
 Rachel Goswell – vocals, acoustic guitar
 David Naughton – shaker, vibraphone
 Melanie Shallenberg – flute
 Mother Nature: rain
 "Beautiful Feeling"
 Rachel Goswell – vocals, acoustic guitar, accordion
 Jeremy Perl – cello
 Richard Lane – violin
 Michael Perl – violin
 Reiad Chiba – viola
 "Sleepless & Tooting"
 Rachel Goswell – vocals, snare drum
 Joe Light – bass, main guitar, acoustic guitar, electric guitar, bongos, shaker, low hit
 David Naughton – mini Spanish guitar, rain stick, ethnic tambourine, ride cymbal
 Bill Drake – Hammond organ
 Recorded at:
 The Troll Boudoir, Camden
 The Sleep Shelter, Tooting
 Tower of Power, London
 The Shed & The Cottage, Lostwithiel
 Mayfair 6, London
 M3 HQ, St Merryn
 Beech Studios, London
 Ambient field recordings recorded at:
 Chislehurst Caves, Kent
 Lostwithiel
 St Merryn airfield
 Camden Road, London
 Chiang Mai and Cha-am, Thailand
 Copyist: Stephen Lipson.
 Mastered by Tony Cousins at Metropolis Mastering.
 Front cover oil painting by T. Jackiewiecz.
 Layout by Alison Fielding.
 Typography by Rachel Goswell.
 Inner sleeve main photograph by Alan Forrester.
 Snapshots by Ashley Bates, David Naughton, and Rachel Goswell.

References

2004 debut albums
4AD albums